Dendrosenecio brassiciformis is one of the East African giant groundsel, this one is endemic to the slopes of Aberdare Range and bearing fruit but once, and dying after.  Once considered to be of the genus Senecio but since have been reclassified into their own genus Dendrosenecio.

Distribution
Dendrosenecio brassiciformis lives on the Aberdare Range between the altitudes of 2,950 and 3,950 meters (9,700 and 13,000 feet).

Infraspecific name synonymy
Dendrosenecio brassica B.Nord. subsp. brassiciformis (R.E.Fr. & T.C.E.Fr.) B.Nord.  
Dendrosenecio brassiciformis (R.E.Fr. & T.C.E.Fr.) Mabb.  
Senecio brassica R.E.Fr. & T.C.E.Fr. subsp. brassiciformis (R.E.Fr. & T.C.E.Fr.) Mabb.  
Senecio brassiciformis R.E.Fr. & T.C.E.Fr.

References

External links

brassiciformis
Endemic flora of Kenya
Afromontane flora